This article concerns LGBT history in the Nordic country of Sweden.

History
Homosexuality in Sweden was decriminalised in 1944.

6 years later, the Swedish Federation for LGBT Rights (RFSL) was founded.

See also
LGBT rights in Sweden
LGBT rights by country or territory

References

Further reading
 Bertilsdotter Rosqvist, Hanna, and Klara Arnberg. "Ambivalent Spaces—The Emergence of a New Gay Male Norm Situated Between Notions of the Commercial and the Political in the Swedish Gay Press, 1969–1986." Journal of homosexuality 62.6 (2015): 763–781.
 Carlson-Rainer, Elise. "Sweden Is a World Leader in Peace, Security, and Human Rights." World Affairs 180.4 (2017): 79–85. online
 Rydström, Jens. Odd couples: A history of gay marriage in Scandinavia (Amsterdam Univ. Press, 2011).
 Rydström, J. Sinners and citizens: Bestiality and homosexuality in Sweden, 1880–1950 (U  of Chicago Press, 2003) online.
 Rydström J. & K. Mustola, eds. Criminally queer: homosexuality and criminal law in Scandinavia 1842–1999 (Amsterdam: Aksant, 2007). online
 Sundevall, Fia, and Alma Persson. "LGBT in the military: policy development in Sweden 1944–2014." Sexuality Research and Social Policy 13.2 (2016): 119–129. online

External links